Gísli Marteinn Baldursson (born 26 February 1972) is an Icelandic television host and a former politician. He is known for hosting the talk shows Laugardagskvöld með Gísla Marteini and Vikan með Gísla Marteini as well as the Icelandic broadcasts of the Eurovision Song Contest.

Early life
Gísli grew up in Hólar in Breiðholt where he lived until his twenties when he moved to Vesturbær.

Television career
Gísli Marteinn started working at RÚV in 1997, first as a journalist and later as a programmer. He was the initiator of the show Kastljós in 2000. In 2002, he started hosting the talk show Laugardagskvöld með Gísla Marteini. In 2003, he won the Edda Award for Best Television Personality. In 2013 he hosted the show Sunnudagsmorgun.

He hosted the Icelandic broadcasts of the Eurovision Song Contest from 1999 to 2005 and again from 2016.

Political career
Gísli Marteinn was a city ​​representative for the Independence Party in the Reykjavík City Council from 2005 to 2013. He was previously a debuty representative from 2003 to 2005. He left politics in 2013 an returned to television.

References

External links

1972 births
Living people
Gisli Marteinn Baldursson
Gisli Marteinn Baldursson
Gisli Marteinn Baldursson
Politicians from Reykjavík